Arboretum Island, aka Nezahat Gökyiğit Botanical Garden, is an arboretum located in Ümraniye district Istanbul Province, Turkey.

Opened in 2002 to the public, it was named in honor of Nezhat Gökyiğit, spouse of Turkish businessman Nihat Gökyiğit. It contains about 50,000 plants in an area covering .

References

Arboreta in Turkey
Botanical gardens in Turkey
Protected areas of Turkey
Protected areas established in 2002
2002 establishments in Turkey
Ümraniye